"Devil's Right Hand" is a song written and originally recorded and released by Steve Earle. It first appeared on a single ("Squeeze Me In" / "Devil's Right Hand", 1983) and later on Earle's album Copperhead Road (1988).

The song has been covered by many artists, including Waylon Jennings (1986) and the Highwaymen (1995). Johnny Cash also recorded a solo version, released posthumously, in 2003 in the box set titled Unearthed.

References 

1983 songs
1983 singles
Songs written by Steve Earle
Epic Records singles
Steve Earle songs